Irina Sidorova (born 25 September 1962) is a Soviet diver. She competed in the women's 3 metre springboard event at the 1980 Summer Olympics.

References

1962 births
Living people
Soviet female divers
Olympic divers of the Soviet Union
Divers at the 1980 Summer Olympics
Sportspeople from Minsk